Netra  is a panchayat village in the state of Rajasthan, India.   Administratively, Netra is under Bawadi tehsil of Jodhpur District in Rajasthan. Netra is the only village in its gram panchayat.  The village is located on National Highway 65, 8 km by road southwest of the town of Baori, and 37 km by road north-northeast of the city of Jodhpur.

Demographics 
In the 2001 census, the village of Netra had 3,757 inhabitants, with 1,989 males (52.9%) and 1,768 females (47.1%), for a gender ratio of 889 females per thousand males.

Notes

External links 
 

Villages in Jodhpur district